Ostrowik may refer to the following places:
Ostrowik, Podlaskie Voivodeship (north-east Poland)
Ostrowik, Otwock County in Masovian Voivodeship (east-central Poland)
Ostrowik, Wołomin County in Masovian Voivodeship (east-central Poland)
Ostrówik, Masovian Voivodeship (east-central Poland)